Leskovec v Podborštu is a settlement in the Municipality of Sevnica in central Slovenia. The area is part of the historical region of Lower Carniola. The municipality is now included in the Lower Sava Statistical Region.

Name
The name of the settlement was changed from Leskovec to Leskovec v Podborštu in 1953.

Church

The local church is dedicated to Our Lady of Sorrows and belongs to the Parish of Šentjanž. It dates to the 17th century and stands on Leskovec Hill.

References

External links
Leskovec v Podborštu at Geopedia

Populated places in the Municipality of Sevnica